Isla Bermejo is an island that is part of the eastern coast of Argentina, forming part of a row of islands that stand at the entrance of the ria of Bahía Blanca near the city of Bahía Blanca.

References
Notes

Bibliography
 United States. National Geospatial-Intelligence Agency (2004). Pub124, 2004 Sailing Directions (Enroute): East Coast of South America. ProStar Publications. p. 146. 

Atlantic islands of Argentina